Tillbaka till samtiden (Swedish for Back to the Present) is the seventh studio album by Swedish alternative rock band Kent. It was released on 17 October 2007 in Scandinavia through RCA Records and Sony BMG. The album is produced with Danish producer Joshua. The title means "Back to the Present", a pun on the Swedish translated title of Back to the Future (Tillbaka till framtiden). The album peaked at number one in Sweden, number two in Norway, number three in Finland and number five in Denmark. It has been certified double platinum in Sweden.

Background
The band began recording Tillbaka till samtiden in November 2006 in Allaire Studios in New York City. In October 2006, just one month prior to the recording sessions rhythm guitarist Harri Mänty left the band which meant it was "more vulnerable when being one man less, but it has also glued us more together", according to guitarist Sami Sirviö.

Musically, the band were influenced by electronic music artists such as Plastikman, Aphex Twin, and Anthony Rother. Sami Sirviö has said he was "tired of guitars" after recording the previous album, Du & jag döden (2005).

Track listing

Personnel
Kent – production
Joshua – production, recording, mixing
Joakim Berg – lyrics, music
Martin Sköld – music on track 2, 4, 5, 6, 7, 10
Martin Brengesjö – instrument technician
Stephanie DuFresne – recording assistant
Chris Athens – mastering
Goran Kajfes – trumpet on track 1, 8
Camela – vocals on track 7, 10

Charts and certifications

Weekly charts

Year-end charts

Certifications

References

2007 albums
Kent (band) albums
Albums produced by Joshua (record producer)